Traveller Supplement Adventure 3: Twilight's Peak is a 1980 role-playing game adventure for Traveller published by Game Designers' Workshop.

Plot summary
Twilight's Peak is an adventure that spans more than 30 world across four subsectors of the Spinward Marches before concentrating on one planet where the player characters may learn the secret of the lost drug convoy of Twilight's Peak, as well as solve the mystery of the long-dead Ancients.

Reception
William A. Barton reviewed Twilight's Peak in The Space Gamer No. 34. Barton commented that "If there are any serious flaws to be found in Twilight's Peak, this reviewer was unable to locate them. It is the best adventure thus far created for Traveller. Don't pass this one up - not even for a cargo hold of advanced powered battle armor."

Andy Slack reviewed Twilight's Peak for White Dwarf #24, giving it an overall rating of 10 out of 10, and stated that "In conclusion, I can only say: This is how Traveller should be. Buy it."

Twilight's Peak was awarded the H.G. Wells Award for "Best Roleplaying Adventure of 1980".

References

Origins Award winners
Role-playing game supplements introduced in 1980
Traveller (role-playing game) adventures